Charles Richard "Rick" Snyder (1944–2006) was an American psychologist who specialized in  positive psychology. He was a Wright Distinguished Professor of Clinical Psychology at the University of Kansas and editor of the Journal of Social and Clinical Psychology.

Snyder was internationally known for his work at the interface of clinical, social, personality and health psychology. His theories pertained to how people react to personal feedback, the human need for uniqueness, the ubiquitous drive to excuse transgressions and, most recently, the hope motive.

Education
Snyder  obtained his Ph.D from Southern Methodist University, then had doctoral training in clinical psychology at Vanderbilt University, and then  postdoctoral training at the Langley Porter Institute.

Career
He was a pioneer in the field of positive psychology, and wrote  the first textbook in that field, Positive Psychology.

He was best known for  his work on hope and forgiveness, and also developed theories explaining how people react to personal feedback, to the human need for uniqueness, and to the drive to excuse and forgive transgressions. His theory of hope emphasizes goal-directed thinking, where a person uses both pathways thinking (the perceived capacity to find routes to  their desired goals) and agency thinking (the necessary motivation to use those routes). His analysis of the motivational forces – excuse-making and forgiveness –    allowed individuals to disconnect themselves from past negative experiences and connect themselves to hope, the possibilities of the future. In 2000, he   demonstrated his hope theory  on Good Morning America by conducting a live experiment with the show's correspondents.

Publications

Books
Uniqueness: The Human Pursuit of Difference  1980, C.R. Snyder and Howard L. Fromkin
Excuses: Masquerades in Search of Grace  1983, C.R. Snyder, Raymond L. Higgins and Rita J. Stuckey
Coping with Negative Life Events  1987, Edited by C.R. Snyder and Carol E. Ford
Self-Handicapping: The Paradox That Isn't  1990, Raymond L. Higgins, C.R. Snyder and Steve Berglas
The Psychology of Hope: You Can Get There From Here  1994, C.R. Snyder
Social Cognitive Psychology, History and Current Domains  1997, David F. Barone, James E. Maddux, and C.R. Snyder
Making Hope Happen: A Workbook for Turning Possibilities Into Reality  1999, Diane McDermott and C.R. Snyder
Coping, The Psychology of What Works  1999, Edited by C.R. Snyder
Handbook of Hope: Theory, Measures and Applications  2000, Edited by C.R. Snyder
Handbook of Psychological Change: Psychotherapy Processes and Practices for the 21st Century  2000, Edited by C.R. Snyder and Rick E. Ingram
The Great Big Book of Hope: Help Your Children Achieve Their Dreams  2000, Diane McDermott and C.R. Snyder
Coping with Stress  2001, Edited by C.R. Snyder
Positive Psychological Assessment: A Handbook of Models and Measures  2003 Edited by C.R. Snyder and Shane J. Lopez
Positive Psychology: The Scientific and Practical Explorations of Human Strength  2008, C.R. Snyder, Shane J. Lopez and Jennifer T. Pedrotti
Oxford Handbook of Positive Psychology  2009, 2011 Edited by C.R. Snyder and Shane J. Lopez

Honors

Snyder received 27 teaching awards at the university, state, and national level, and 31 research awards, including the 2002 Balfour Jeffrey Award for Research Achievement in Humanities and Social Science and the 2001 Guilford Press Award for Pioneering Scholarly Contributions in Clinical/Social/Personality Psychology.

Snyder was two times awarded KU's Outstanding Progressive Educator award (known as the HOPE award) by the undergraduate seniors. he became a fellow of the American Psychological Association's Division of Teaching  In 1995 Snyder directed the phd dissertation for 41 students, and received APA's Raymond Fowler Outstanding Graduate Mentor Award in 2000. In 2005, he received an honorary doctorate from Indiana Wesleyan University. His research on uniqueness was the subject of a Sunday Doonesbury cartoon sequence,  .

References

Further reading 
Lopez, Shane J. and Candice A. Ackerman. "Snyder, C. R.." The Encyclopedia of Positive Psychology. Lopez, Shane J. Blackwell Publishing, 2009. Blackwell Reference Online. 2 August 2011 

Positive psychologists
20th-century American psychologists
1944 births
2006 deaths
University of Kansas faculty